Unger Baptist Church is a church in Unger village, Mokokchung District, Nagaland, India.

history
The church was founded in 1916. The first recorded baptism took place on 15 June 1916, and the first baptised member of the church was Mr. Noklemchiba. Since then, Unger Baptist Arogo has celebrated Silver and Golden Jubilees.

Unger is a village with about 200 households and today 99.9% of the villagers are Christian.

Unger Baptist Arogo is affiliated with the Ao Baptist Arogo Mungdang, Impur, Nagaland, India.unger is a village in lanpangkong range under mokokchung district

References

Christianity in Nagaland
Baptist churches in India
Mokokchung district
2016 establishments in India